The 2015–16 Kansas State Wildcats men's basketball team represented Kansas State University in the 2015–16 NCAA Division I men's basketball season. Their head coach was Bruce Weber in his fourth year at the helm of the Wildcats. The team played its home games in Bramlage Coliseum in Manhattan, its home court since 1988. They were a member of the Big 12 Conference. They finished the season 17–16, 5–13 in Big 12 play to finish in eighth place. They defeated Oklahoma State in the first round of the Big 12 tournament to advance to the quarterfinals where they lost to Kansas.

Preseason
The Wildcats finished the previous season 15–17 record 8–10 in Big 12 Play to finish in a tie for eighth place. They lost in the first round of the Big 12 tournament to TCU.

Departures

Incoming Transfers

Class of 2015 recruits

Roster

Schedule

|-
!colspan=12 style="background:#512888; color:#FFFFFF;"| Exhibition
|-

|-
!colspan=12 style="background:#512888; color:#FFFFFF;"| Regular season

|-
!colspan=12 style="background:#512888; color:#FFFFFF;"| Big 12 tournament

See also
2015–16 Kansas State Wildcats women's basketball team

References

Kansas State Wildcats men's basketball seasons
Kansas State
2015 in sports in Kansas
2016 in sports in Kansas